Ahmed Almukhtar (born February 19, 1993) is a Saudi Arabian professional basketball player.  He currently plays for Uhud Medina of the Saudi Premier League.

He represented Saudi Arabia's national basketball team at the 2017 Arab Nations Basketball Championship in Egypt. There, he was his team's best 3 point shooter.

References

External links
 2013 FIBA Asia Championship Profile
 Asia-basket.com Profile
 REAL GM Profile

1993 births
Living people
Forwards (basketball)
Saudi Arabian men's basketball players
People from Medina
20th-century Saudi Arabian people
21st-century Saudi Arabian people